Jackie Chan Stuntmaster, titled Jackie Chan's Stuntmaster in PAL's in-game menu, is a beat 'em up platform game developed by Radical Entertainment and published by Midway Home Entertainment for the PlayStation.

It stars martial artist Jackie Chan, who fights his way past numerous villains in different locations across New York City.

Plot 
Jackie's grandfather (Fredrick) has been kidnapped and Jackie needs to get him back. This means fighting his way through New York City to get to him. Jackie also faces a number of different challenges in which the player must use a combination of moves to succeed. The game boasts 15 fully 3D levels with different environmental obstacles to cross.

Development 
The game was showcased at E3 1999. While making the game, Radical Entertainment consulted Jackie at every point so as to give the game the feeling of a Jackie Chan film. This included using Jackie for motion capture, so that the character in the game was performing the same moves as the man himself. He also provided his voice for the game. Also, when the player completes the game with all of the golden dragons collected, a video is shown with Jackie talking about the game as well as behind-the-scenes footage during the motion capture.

Reception 

The game received "average" reviews according to the review aggregation website GameRankings. Jeff Lundrigan of NextGen criticized the game as "one of the least inventive beat-'em-ups in years" and concluded his early review in four words: "Jackie Chan deserves better."

References

External links 

2000 video games
3D beat 'em ups
3D platform games
Gangs in fiction
Jackie Chan video games
Kidnapping in fiction
Midway video games
Organized crime video games
PlayStation (console) games
PlayStation (console)-only games
Radical Entertainment games
Single-player video games
Sony Interactive Entertainment games
Video games scored by Graig Robertson
Video games set in New York City